Branka Pujić (born 6 November 1963) is a Serbian actress.

Filmography

Television roles 
 "Ruža vjetrova" as Suzana Matošić (2011-2013)
 "Totalno novi talas" as Goca (2010)
 "Greh njene majke" (2010)
 "Zauvijek mlad" (2009)
 "Ranjeni orao" (2008–2009)
 "Zaboravljeni umovi Srbije" (2008)
 "Vratiće se rode" (2008)
 "Zaustavi vreme" (2008)
 "Pozorište u kući" as Mrs. Marković (2007)
 "Stižu dolari" as Jelena Ljutić (2004–2006)
 "Neki novi klinci" as Miss Piggy (2003)
 "Policajac sa Petlovog Brda" (1993–1994)

Movie roles 
 "Ma nije on takav" as Margita (2010)
 "Montevideo, God Bless You!" (2010)
 "Najmiliji" (2010)
 "The Brothers Bloom" (2008)
 "Dva" (2007)
 "Božićna pečenica" as Katja Maksić (2007)
 "Taksista" as Divna (2003)
 "Breg čežnje" as Vera (2002)
 "Moja porodica, privatizacija i ja" as Natalija (2001)
 "Senke uspomena" (2000)
 "Tango je tužna misao koja se pleše" (1997)
 "Svadbeni marš" as Jelena Mitrović (1995)
 "Ni na nebu ni na zemlji" (1994)
 "Biće bolje" (1994)
 "Dva sata kvalitetnog programa" as Maca (1994)
 "Prokleta je Amerika" (1992)
 "Zagreb-Beograd preko Sarajeva" (1992.)
 "Koju igru igraš" (1992)
 "Brod plovi za Šangaj" (1991)
 "Bračna putovanja" as Anabela (1991)
 "Sveto mesto" as Katarina (1990)
 "Pod žvrnjem" (1990)
 "Najbolji" as Mejra (1989)
 "Braća po materi" (1988)
 "Vanbračna putovanja" as Anabela (1988)
 "Sentimentalna priča" as Marijana (1988.)
 "Dečji bič" as Vida (1988)

External links

1963 births
Living people
Serbian actresses
Actresses from Belgrade